The Arfakiana tree frog (Litoria arfakiana) is a species of frog in the subfamily Pelodryadinae. It is found in New Guinea.

Distribution and habitat
Its natural habitats are subtropical or tropical moist lowland forests, subtropical or tropical moist montane forests, rivers, and heavily degraded former forest.

In the Upper Kaironk Valley of Madang Province, Papua New Guinea, it is frequently found in Phragmites karka reed beds and among Miscanthus cane.

It is threatened by habitat loss.

References

External links
Litoria arfakiana information from Bishop Museum

Litoria
Amphibians of New Guinea
Amphibians described in 1878
Taxa named by Wilhelm Peters
Taxonomy articles created by Polbot